Lunardi is an Italian surname. Notable people with the surname include:

Alessandra Lunardi (born 1958), Italian mathematician
Ivan Lunardi (born 1973), Italian ski jumper
Joe Lunardi, American sportscaster
Leda Lunardi, Brazilian-American electrical engineer
Paul J. Lunardi (1921–2013), American politician
Pietro Lunardi (born 1939), Italian politician
Vincenzo Lunardi (1754–1806), Italian balloonist

See also
Lunardini

Italian-language surnames